Pedro Augusto Cabral Carvalho (born 26 March 1999), commonly known as Pedro, is a Brazilian footballer who plays as a forward for Egnatia Rrogozhinë in Kategoria Superiore.

Career
Pedro came through the youth system at América Mineiro, featuring in the 2019 Copa São Paulo de Futebol Júnior, where he scored a hattrick in his second game. He made his senior club debut as a late substitute against Boa Esporte in Campeonato Mineiro on 24 February 2019. His debut in the domestic national league came on 1 May 2019 in Campeonato Brasileiro Série B as a late substitute against Botafogo-SP.

References

External links
 

Living people
1999 births
Brazilian footballers
Association football forwards
América Futebol Clube (MG) players
Campeonato Brasileiro Série B players